Tytus Maksymilian Huber (also known as Maksymilian Tytus Huber; 4 January 1872 in Krościenko nad Dunajcem – 9 December 1950) was a Polish mechanical engineer, educator, and scientist. He was a member of the pre-war Polish scientific foundation, Kasa im. Józefa Mianowskiego.

His career began as a professor at Lwów Polytechnic (now known as the Lviv Polytechnic) in 1908, later serving as rector from 1922 to 1923. In the late 1920s he was professor and department chair of Warsaw University of Technology. After the Second World War he helped organize the Gdańsk University of Technology.

In 1949, he was named department chair at AGH University of Science and Technology, serving until his death the following year, at the age of 78.

Tensile Stress Theorem
He formulated the tensile stress theorem, an important equation in studies of tension known also as Huber's equation.

See also

 Yield surface
 Stress–energy tensor
 Maxwell–Huber–Hencky–von Mises theory

External links
 PROFESOR HUBER -naukowiec, społecznik, ostatni prezes Kasy im. Mianowskiego, retrieved 2008-05-31.
 Sylwetka profesora Tytusa Maksymiliana Hubera

Polish educators
Polish engineers
Polish scientists
1872 births
1950 deaths
Academic staff of the Warsaw University of Technology
Lviv Polytechnic alumni
Lviv Polytechnic rectors
Recipients of the State Award Badge (Poland)